Rosa banksiae, common names Lady Banks' rose, or just Banks' rose, is a species of flowering plant in the rose family, native to central and western China, in the provinces of Gansu, Guizhou, Henan, Hubei, Jiangsu, Sichuan and Yunnan, at altitudes of . The rose is named for Dorothea Lady Banks, the wife of the botanist Sir Joseph Banks.

Description

Unlike most roses, it is practically thornless, though it may bear some prickles up to 5 mm long, particularly on stout, strong shoots. The leaves are evergreen, 4–6 cm long, with three to five (rarely seven) leaflets 2–5 cm long with a serrated margin.

The flowers are small, 1.5–2.5 cm diameter, white or pale yellow and are fragrant. It is amongst the earliest flowering of all roses, usually appearing during May in the northern hemisphere, though cold weather can delay flowering. All Lady Banks' roses are said to smell of violets to varying degrees.

Taxonomy
"R. banksiae" was first described and published by W. T. Aiton in 'Hortus kew.' edition 2, Vol.3 on page 258 in 1811. Some places attribute Robert Brown as the author  but it was agreed in 2018 by ICN that W. T. Aiton was the true author.

Cultivation and uses

Lady Banks Rose (Rosa Banksiae) - The leaves of this plant are said to possess qualities useful in the treatment of wounds and the promotion of tissue formation.  The plant is also rich in tannins which are used medicinally as astringents.

Rosa banksiae has likely been grown in the gardens of China for hundreds of years. The species was introduced to Europe by William Kerr, who had been sent on a plant-hunting expedition by Sir Joseph Banks. He bought the first Lady Banks' Rose, subsequently named the white Lady Banks (R. banksiae var. banksiae) from the famous Fa Tee nursery in 1807.

A number of other forms were subsequently discovered growing in China, including R. banksiae var. normalis (see above), and R. banksiae 'Lutea', the yellow Lady Banks' rose (brought to Europe in 1824 by J. D. Parks). In 1993 this cultivar earned the Royal Horticultural Society's Award of Garden Merit. It is used in traditional Chinese medicine, with portions of other plants and herbs (such as monkshood and Ligusticum wallichii) to make a liniment to treat a painful swelling of the joints.

An R. banksiae planted in Tombstone, Arizona in 1885 is reputedly the world's largest rose bush.

Varieties
There are two varieties:
R. banksiae var. banksiae – flowers semi-double or double, with numerous petals replacing most or all of the stamens; a cultigen developed in Chinese gardens
R. banksiae var. normalis – flowers single, with five petals; the natural wild form of the species

Gallery

References

Other sources
Climbing Roses of the World by Charles Quest-Ritson
The Graham Stuart Thomas Rose Book by Graham Stuart Thomas

banksiae
Flora of China
Flora of Asia
Ornamental plants